Won Ji-an, (born Kim In-sun on August 17, 1999) is a South Korean actress, who made her acting debut in D.P. (2021) and best known for her role in the drama If You Wish Upon Me (2022).

Filmography

Film

Television series

Web series

Awards and nominations

References 

Living people
21st-century South Korean actresses
South Korean film actresses
South Korean television actresses
1999 births